Erik Kastebo (1935–2019) was an international speedway rider from Denmark.

Speedway career 
Kastebo was a two times champion of Denmark, winning the Danish Championship in 1959 and 1965.

References 

1935 births
2019 deaths
Danish speedway riders